Ivan Milat-Luketa (7 January 1922 – 3 August 2009) was a Croatian painter and sculptor. He is a painter of the modern era in Croatian art history.

Life
Ivan Milat-Luketa was born on 7 January 1922 in Blato, Croatia. In 1925, soon after his father had died, he moved to Dubrovnik where he finished primary and grammar schools. In 1945, he attended the Academy of Art in Zagreb and studied sculpture and painting. He graduated in the class of Oton Postružnik. He got a number of awards and prizes for his artistic work

Works

Milat has portrayed his Croatian homeland in many of his exquisite landscapes which recorded a vanishing time. Numerous drawings, canvases and aquarelles provide a history of Pula, Dubrovnik, Županja, Kutina and Desinić.

His impressionistic eye has synthesized and preserved the best of the tradition of the Zagreb's Academy of Art. He is made famous by his portraits and still-life paintings. He is the sculptor of an extraordinary bronze monument situated in the cemetery of the city of Kutina, a lyric effigy of two young pioneers.

Art critic Juraj Baldani on creativity of Ivan Milat: "Spontaneity of creation, sincerity in experience, and mastery in performance are the elements of this creativity. He has never torn the straight connection with his impulses and inspirations, with the nature and surrounding people. By building in his art into life, Ivan Milat has been drawing the knowledge from the daily, finding the truth in the simplicity, longing for the beauty through emotions. He has been the painter of the actuality of his life's space and time."

Painter of op-art and new tendencies Miroslav Šutej on Milat's portraits: "We see that he is occupied by a need for rendering the minute feeling. He picks the themes which, by their natural spontaneity, force him to be direct. Made very quickly, those drawings radiate the charm of the moment of the uncatchable children's world."

Notes

References
Mladen Mitar, Ivan Milat, 55 godina Nula dies sine linea, Muzej Moslavine, Kutina, 2007, 
Juraj Baldani, Ivan Milat samostalna izložba, 60 godina života, 30 godina umjetničkog rada, Kutina, Muzej Moslavine, 1982

External links
Muzej Moslavine 1 
Muzej Moslavine 2 

1922 births
2009 deaths
Croatian sculptors
20th-century Croatian sculptors
20th-century Croatian painters
Croatian male painters
21st-century Croatian sculptors
21st-century Croatian painters
21st-century male artists
Yugoslav painters
Yugoslav sculptors
20th-century Croatian male artists